Abū ʿĪsā Muḥammad ibn ʿĪsā as-Sulamī aḍ-Ḍarīr al-Būghī at-Tirmidhī (Termezī; 824 – 9 October 892 CE / 209 - 279 AH), often referred to as Imām at-Termezī/Tirmidhī, was an Islamic scholar, and collector of hadith from Termez (early Khorasan and in present-day Uzbekistan). He wrote al-Jami` as-Sahih (known as Jami` at-Tirmidhi), one of the six canonical hadith compilations in Sunni Islam. He also wrote Shama'il Muhammadiyah (popularly known as Shama'il at-Tirmidhi), a compilation of hadiths concerning the person and character of the Islamic prophet, Muhammad. At-Tirmidhi was also well versed in Arabic grammar, favoring the school of Kufa over Basra due to the former's preservation of Arabic poetry as a primary source.

Biography

Name and lineage

Al-Tirmidhi's given name (ism) was "Muhammad" while his kunya was "Abu `Isa" ("father of `Isa"). His genealogy is uncertain; his nasab (patronymic) has variously been given as:
 Muḥammad ibn ‛Īsá ibn Sawrah‎
 Muḥammad ibn ‛Īsá ibn Sawrah ibn Mūsá ibn aḍ-Ḍaḥḥāk‎
 Muḥammad ibn ‛Īsá ibn Sawrah ibn Shaddād‎
 Muḥammad ibn ‛Īsá ibn Sawrah ibn Shaddād ibn aḍ-Ḍaḥḥāk‎
 Muḥammad ibn ‛Īsá ibn Sawrah ibn Shaddād ibn ‛Īsá‎
 Muḥammad ibn ‛Īsá ibn Yazīd ibn Sawrah ibn as-Sakan‎
 Muḥammad ibn ‛Īsá ibn Sahl‎
 Muḥammad ibn ‛Īsá ibn Sahl ibn Sawrah‎

He was also known by the laqab "ad-Darir" ("the Blind"). It has been said that he was born blind, but the majority of scholars agree that he became blind later in his life.

At-Tirmidhi's grandfather was originally from Marw (Persian: Merv), but moved to Tirmidh. 
According to Britannica Online, he was an Arab. According to S.H. Nasr and M. Mutahhari in The Cambridge History of Iran, Al-Tirmidhi was of Persian ethnicity. His uncle was the famous Sufi Abu Bakr al-Warraq. Al-Warraq was the teacher of Al-Hakim al-Samarqandi, a known associate of the famous theologian Abu Mansur Al-Matuiridi.

Birth
Muhammad ibn `Isa at-Tirmidhi was born during the reign of the Abbasid caliph al-Ma'mun. His year of birth has been reported as 209 AH (824/825). Adh-Dhahabi only states that at-Tirmidhi was born near the year 210 AH (825/826), thus some sources give his year of birth as 210 AH. Some sources indicate that he was born in Mecca (Siddiqi says he was born in Mecca in 206 AH (821/822)) while others say he was born in Tirmidh (Persian: Termez), in what is now southern Uzbekistan. The stronger opinion is that he was born in Tirmidh. Specifically, he was born in one of its suburbs, the village of Bugh (hence the nisbats "at-Tirmidhi" and "al-Bughi").

Hadith studies
At-Tirmidhi began the study of hadith at the age of 20. From the year 235 AH (849/850) he traveled widely in Khurasan, Iraq, and the Hijaz in order to collect hadith. His teachers and those he narrated from included:
 al-Bukhari
 Abū Rajā’ Qutaybah ibn Sa‘īd al-Balkhī al-Baghlāni
 ‘Alī ibn Ḥujr ibn Iyās as-Sa‘dī al-Marwazī
 Muḥammad ibn Bashshār al-Baṣrī
 ‘Abd Allāh ibn Mu‘āwiyah al-Jumaḥī al-Baṣrī
 Abū Muṣ‘ab az-Zuhrī al-Madanī
 Muḥammad ibn ‘Abd al-Mālik ibn Abī ash-Shawārib al-Umawī al-Baṣrī
 Ismā‘īl ibn Mūsá al-Fazārī al-Kūfi
 Muḥammad ibn Abī Ma‘shar as-Sindī al-Madanī
 Abū Kurayb Muḥammad ibn al-‘Alā’ al-Kūfī
 Hanād ibn al-Sarī al-Kūfī
 Ibrāhīm ibn ‘Abd Allāh al-Harawī
 Suwayd ibn Naṣr ibn Suwayd al-Marwazī
 Muḥammad ibn Mūsā al-Baṣrī
 Zayd ibn Akhzam al-Baṣrī
 al-‘Abbās al-‘Anbarī al-Baṣrī
 Muḥammad ibn al-Muthanná al-Baṣrī
 Muḥammad ibn Ma‘mar al-Baṣrī
 ad-Darimi
 Muslim
 Abu Dawud

At the time, Khurasan, at-Tirmidhi's native land, was a major center of learning, being home to a large number of muhaddiths. Other major centers of learning visited by at-Tirmidhi were the Iraqi cities of Kufa and Basra. At-Tirmidhi reported hadith from 42 Kufan teachers. In his Jami`, he used more reports from Kufan teachers than from teachers of any other town.

At-Tirmidhi was a pupil of al-Bukhari, who was based in Khurasan. Adh-Dhahabi wrote, "His knowledge of hadith came from al-Bukhari." At-Tirmidhi mentioned al-Bukhari's name 114 times in his Jami`. He used al-Bukhari's Kitab at-Tarikh as a source when mentioning discrepancies in the text of a hadith or its transmitters, and praised al-Bukhari as being the most knowledgeable person in Iraq or Khurasan in the science of discrepancies of hadith. When mentioning the rulings of jurists, he followed al-Bukhari's practice of not mentioning the name of Abu Hanifah. Because he never received a reliable chain of narrators to mention Abu Hanifa's decrees, he would instead attribute them to "some people of Kufa." Al-Bukhari held at-Tirmidhi in high regard as well. He is reported to have told at-Tirmidhi, "I have profited more from you than you have from me," and in his Sahih he narrated two hadith from at-Tirmidhi.

At-Tirmidhi also narrated some hadiths from Abu Dawud, and one from Muslim. Muslim also narrated one hadith from at-Tirmidhi in his own Sahih.

A.J. Wensinck mentions Ahmad ibn Hanbal as among at-Tirmidhi's teachers. However, Hoosen states that according to the most reliable sources, at-Tirmidhi never went to Baghdad, nor did he attend any lectures of Ahmad ibn Hanbal. Furthermore, at-Tirmidhi never directly narrates from Ahmad ibn Hanbal in his Jami`.

Several of at-Tirmidhi's teachers also taught al-Bukhari, Muslim, Abu Dawud, Ibn Majah, and an-Nasa'i.

Writings
 Al-Jami' al-Mukhtasar min as-Sunan 'an Rasul Allah, known as Jami' at-Tirmidhi
 Al-'Ilal as-Sughra
 Az-Zuhd
 Al-'Ilal al-Kubra
 Ash-Shama'il an-Nabawiyya wa'l-Fada'il al-Mustafawiyya
 Al-Asma' wa'l-Kuna
 Kitab at-Tarikh
 Khatm al-Awliya'

Accusation of heresy by some Hanbalites 
Al-Tirmidhi was accused of being a Jahmite heretic, and was harshly criticized by some fanatic Hanbali followers, including Abu Bakr al-Khallal (d. 311/923) in his Kitab al-Sunna (Book of the Prophetic Tradition), because he rejected a narration attributed to Mujahid concerning the explanation of the verse 79 from Surat al-Isra' in the Qur'an about the praiseworthy station of Muhammad, known as "al-Maqam al-Mahmud".

The verse is: 

The Hanbalites interpreted the Praiseworthy Station as the seating of Muhammad on the Throne next to God, despite the overall weakness of the narrations supporting it.

Death
At-Tirmidhi was blind in the last two years of his life, according to adh-Dhahabi. His blindness is said to have been the consequence of excessive weeping, either due to fear of God or over the death of al-Bukhari.

He died on Monday night, 13 Rajab 279 AH (Sunday night, 8 October 892) in Bugh.

At-Tirmidhi is buried on the outskirts of Sherobod, 60 kilometers north of Termez in Uzbekistan. In Termez he is locally known as Abu Isa at-Termezi or "Termez Ota" ("Father of Termez").

See also 
 Al-Tabari

Early Islam scholars

Notes

References

External links

 Biodata at MuslimScholars.info
 Biography at Sunnah.com
 Biography of Imam al-Tirmidhi at Sunnah.org 
 Biography of al-Tirmidhee at theclearpath.com

Sunni Muslim scholars of Islam
Transoxanian Islamic scholars
Persian Sunni Muslim scholars of Islam
Hadith compilers
Hadith scholars
9th-century Persian-language writers
Muslim scholars persecuted by Hanbalis
People from Surxondaryo Region
Shafi'is
9th-century Islamic religious leaders
9th-century Muslim scholars of Islam
824 births
892 deaths
Biographical evaluation scholars
9th-century people from the Abbasid Caliphate